South railway line in Sydney, Australia may refer to:

Main Southern railway line, New South Wales (the physical railway line)
the former Cityrail passenger line South Line, which runs on the Main Southern railway line, now split into:
Inner West & Leppington Line
Airport & South Line